Alejandro Garnacho Ferreyra (born 1 July 2004) is a professional footballer who plays as a winger for Premier League club Manchester United.

Garnacho joined United's youth system from Atlético Madrid in October 2020. He won the FA Youth Cup and the Jimmy Murphy Young Player of the Year award in May 2022. The month prior, he had made his first-team debut at the age of 17.

Garnacho initially played youth international football for Spain, the country of his birth, before making his debut for Argentina at under-20 level in 2022. He has been called up to the senior Argentina squad but has yet to make an appearance.

Club career

Manchester United

Youth career 
Born in Madrid, Garnacho joined Atlético Madrid's youth system in 2015 from Getafe. In October 2020, he joined the Manchester United Academy. United paid Atlético a £420,000 fee. He signed his first professional contract with the club in July 2021.

He came under the spotlight for his solo goal in the FA Youth Cup win over Everton, which was nominated for United's Goal of the Month award for February 2022. After being named as an unused substitute for several Premier League matches, Garnacho made his first-team debut for United on 28 April, replacing Anthony Elanga in the 91st minute of a 1–1 draw against Chelsea. Garnacho won the Jimmy Murphy Young Player of the Year award in May. He scored twice in the final of the FA Youth Cup against Nottingham Forest on 11 May, helping United win the competition for the first time since 2011.

2022–23 season 
For the start of the 2022–23 Premier League season, he changed his shirt number from 75 to 49. On 4 October, he scored a late winner for United's U21 against Barrow in the 2022–23 EFL Trophy. Garnacho made his first senior start for United on 27 October, in a 3–0 win over Moldovan team Sheriff Tiraspol in the UEFA Europa League, whereafter he was praised by manager Erik ten Hag for his improvement over the past few weeks, saying that though previously dissatisfied, he was happy with Garnacho's improved attitude and resilience. On 3 November, he scored his first senior goal in a Europa League match against Real Sociedad. Garnacho scored his first goal in the Premier League on 13 November, an injury-time winner against Fulham. On 14 January 2023 in the Manchester derby, Garnacho set up Marcus Rashford's 82nd minute winner in a 2–1 win against Manchester City. On 14 March 2023, Garnacho announced he would be sidelined for several weeks after suffering an ankle ligament injury during a game against Southampton.

International career
Garnacho is eligible to play for his country of birth, Spain, and Argentina, as his mother is Argentine. He made three appearances for the Spain under-18 team in 2021.

On 7 March 2022, Garnacho was called up to the senior Argentina team as part of an initial 44-man squad for their two World Cup qualifiers that month. He made it to the final 33-man squad for the fixtures, but did not make an appearance in either game.

Garnacho made his debut for the Argentina under-20 side on 26 March 2022, when he started in a friendly match against the United States. He scored four goals in four appearances for the under-20 team at the 2022 Maurice Revello Tournament winning the Revelation Player and Goal of the Tournament awards.

In March 2023, he was called up once again to the senior Argentina team for two friendly matches against Panama and Curaçao, but had to withdraw from the squad due to suffering an ankle injury.

Career statistics

Honours
Manchester United U18
FA Youth Cup: 2021–22

Manchester United
EFL Cup: 2022–23

Individual
Maurice Revello Tournament Best XI: 2022
Maurice Revello Tournament Revelation Player: 2022
Maurice Revello Tournament Goal of the Tournament: 2022
Jimmy Murphy Young Player of the Year: 2021–22

References

External links

Profile at ManUtd.com

2004 births
Living people
Footballers from Madrid
Citizens of Argentina through descent
Argentine footballers
Argentina youth international footballers
Spanish footballers
Spain youth international footballers
Argentine people of Spanish descent
Spanish people of Argentine descent
Association football forwards
Atlético Madrid footballers
Manchester United F.C. players
Premier League players
Argentine expatriate footballers
Spanish expatriate footballers
Spanish expatriate sportspeople in England
Expatriate footballers in England
Argentine expatriate sportspeople in England